Water supply and sanitation is an ongoing challenge in the nation of Angola.

Background
Angola has historically had issues with corruption and instability hindering its water infrastructure development.

Recent developments
Despite being a relatively poor country, water access has improved in recent history. The percentage of Angolans with access to a stable water supply grew from 42% in 1990 to 54% in 2012.

References

Water supply
Health in Angola